The Sheriff of Forres, was  historically the royal official responsible for enforcing law and order in Forres, Scotland.

Sheriffs of Forres

 Richard..... (1226)
 William Wiseman (1264)
 William de Dolays (1291)
 Alexander Wiseman (1305)
 Andrew..... (1337)
 John of Nairn (1414)

References
Taylor, Alice; The Shape of the State in Medieval Scotland, 1124-1290 (2016).

Sheriff courts
Sheriff